Ingøy or Inga is a small fishing village on the island of Ingøya in Måsøy Municipality, Troms og Finnmark county, Norway. The village lies on the northern coast of the island of Ingøya, facing the open Arctic Ocean. The village is only accessible by boat from the nearby village of Havøysund. Ingøy Church is located in the village.

The mast of the longwave transmitter is the tallest structure in Norway and in all of Scandinavia. There is a fish processing plant in Ingøy called Ingøy Fisk that is one of the main employers in the area.

The village of Ingøy dates back to the 14th century, perhaps earlier. Around 1520, there were about 300 residents living in the village.  During the 17th century, the population declined dramatically and it has stayed sparsely populated since that time.  During the fishing seasons, however, the population would increase temporarily.

References

External links 
 Information and pictures from Ingøy
 Ingøy Festival

Villages in Finnmark
Måsøy